José Ramos may refer to:

Politics
José Ramos Preto (1871–1949), Portuguese jurist and politician 
José Ramos Costa (1926–1989), President of Valencia CF, 1976–1984
José Manuel Ramos Barroso (born 1928), Puerto Rican Senator
José Ramos-Horta (born 1949), second President of East Timor

Sports

Association football (soccer)
José Ramos (Portuguese footballer) (born 1899), Portuguese football forward
José Ramos (Argentine footballer) (1919–1969)
José Ramos Delgado (1935–2010), Argentine footballer and football manager
José Gerson Ramos (born 1981), Brazilian football midfielder
José Ramos (Mexican footballer) (born 1987), Mexican-American footballer

Combat sports
José Ramos (wrestler) (born 1949), Cuban wrestler
Jose Ramos (boxing manager) (born 1965), Puerto Rican boxing manager
José Ramos (judoka) (born 1994), Guatemalan judoka

Other sports
Cheo Ramos (José Ramos, fl. 1910s–1920s), Cuban baseball player
José Ramos (runner) (born 1968), Portuguese long-distance runner
José Ramos Castillo (born 1974), Spanish paralympic swimmer
José Giovanni Ramos (born 1983), Venezuelan sprint canoer
José Ramos (baseball) (born 2001), Panamanian baseball player

Others
José Ramos Muñoz, Spanish archaeologist and professor of prehistory
José Luis Ramos (1790-1849), Venezuelan writer